Danielle "Dani" Hansen (born October 16, 1993 in Modesto, California) is an American rower. She competed at the 2016 Summer Paralympics in Rio de Janeiro. Hansen has won a gold medal and five silver medals from the World Rowing Championships and a silver medal from the 2016 Paralympic Games. She is a Royal Canadian Henley Regatta champion, a four-time Head of the Charles Regatta champion, and two-time U.S. national champion. She was a member of the Paralympic Great Eight at the 2016 Head of the Charles Regatta consisting of gold, silver, and bronze Rio Paralympic medalists from Great Britain, United States, and Canada.

Background
Hansen is diagnosed with Erb's palsy in her left arm. She received her bachelor's degree in psychology at the University of Washington. In 2018 she was a coach for the women's rowing team at the University of Washington. She is currently the lead athlete at Hydrow.

Career

College career
She finished first place at the 2014 Pac-12 Championship in the University of Washington’s novice eight.

Senior career

2014 
Hansen won a silver medal in the Legs, Trunk, & Arms Mixed 4+ at the 2014 World Rowing Championships in Amsterdam, Netherlands.

2015 
Hansen won a silver medal in the Legs, Trunk, & Arms Mixed 4+ at the 2015 World Rowing Championships in Aiguebelette, France.

2016 
Hansen won a silver medal in the Legs, Trunk, & Arms Mixed 4+ at the 2016 Paralympic Games in Rio de Janeiro, Brazil.

In New York City, at the New York Athletic ClubHansen was honored as the USRowing's Fan Choice Awards National Team Athlete of the Year in 2016.

2017 
Hansen won a silver medal in the PR3 Mixed 4+ at the 2017 World Rowing Championships in Sarasota, Florida.

2018

Hansen won a silver medal in the PR3 Mixed 4+ at the 2018 World Rowing Championships in Plovdiv, Bulgaria.

Hansen also won a gold medal and set a World Record in the PR3 w2- with her pair partner, Jaclyn Smith, at the  2018 World Rowing Championships in Plovdiv, Bulgaria.

2019

Hansen won a silver medal in the PR3 Mixed 4+ at the 2019 World Rowing Championships in Ottensheim, Austria.

Senior

References 

1993 births
Living people
American female rowers
World Rowing Championships medalists for the United States
Rowers at the 2016 Summer Paralympics
Rowers at the 2020 Summer Paralympics
Medalists at the 2016 Summer Paralympics
Medalists at the 2020 Summer Paralympics
Paralympic medalists in rowing
Paralympic silver medalists for the United States
Paralympic rowers of the United States
21st-century American women